John Ebersole may refer to:

 John H. Ebersole (1925–1993), American pioneer in submarine medicine and radiation oncology, Captain US Navy
 John Ebersole (American football) (born 1948), American former National Football League player
 John Ebersole (educator) (1944–2016), American educator, author and columnist

See also
 John T. Eversole (1915–1942), U.S. Navy officer